Kull is a collection of Fantasy short stories by Robert E. Howard.  It was first published in 1967 by Lancer Books under the title King Kull.  This edition included three stories completed by Lin Carter from unfinished fragments and drafts by Howard.  Later editions, retitled as Kull, replaced the stories with the uncompleted fragments.  Two of the stories, and the poem, "The King and the Oak", originally appeared in the magazine Weird Tales.

Contents
 Prologue
 "Exile of Atlantis"
 "The Shadow Kingdom"
 "The Altar and the Scorpion"
 "Black Abyss" (completed by Lin Carter from an unfinished draft entitled "The Black City")
 "Delcardes’ Cat"
 "The Skull of Silence"
 "Riders Beyond the Sunrise" (completed by Lin Carter from an untitled fragment)
 "By This Axe I Rule!"
 "The Striking of the Gong"
 "Swords of the Purple Kingdom"
 "Wizard and Warrior" (completed by Lin Carter from an untitled fragment)
 "The Mirrors of Tuzun Thune"
 "The King and the Oak"

Reception
Algis Budrys reviewed the collection favorably, describing Howard's writing as "combining a masochistic megalomania with a strong streak of horror writing." He noted that Carter's pastiche-completion of "Black Abyss" was surprisingly successful.

Publication history
1967, US, Lancer Books 73-650 , Pub date 1967, Paperback, as King Kull by Robert E. Howard and Lin Carter
1976, UK, Sphere Books , Pub date 1976, Paperback, as King Kull
1978, US, Bantam Books , Pub date September 1978, as Kull, removes Carter edits
1995, US, Baen Books , Pub date July 1995, Paperback, as Kull, removes Carter edits, adds story "The Curse of Golden Skull"
2006, US. Del Rey , Pub. date 2006, Trade paperback, as "Kull, Exile of Atlantis", includes early non-Kull work from 1924, as well as biographical essays detailing Kull's creation.

References

Sources

Further reading
"Lin Carter on Kull". Savage Sword of Conan No 3 (Dec 1974). Online at: 

1967 short story collections
Short story collections by Robert E. Howard
Short story collections by Lin Carter
Kull of Atlantis
American short story collections
Lancer Books books
Fantasy short story collections